The Defence Reform Act 2014 is an Act of the Parliament of the United Kingdom concerned with defence procurement and the UK Reserve Forces, particularly the Territorial Army. It has 51 sections and seven schedules.

Part 1 of the Act relates to defence procurement in general. Part 2 created a statutory framework for single-source contracts, operating in accordance with the Single Source Contract Regulations. The Single Source Regulations Office (SSRO) was established under the Act. Part 3 is concerned with reserve forces: the Army Reserve was renamed the Regular Reserve and the Territorial Army was renamed the Army Reserve.

Parliamentary history

First reading
The Act had its first reading in the House of Commons on 3 July 2013. Its backers were the Prime Minister, the Deputy Prime Minister, Treasury Chief Secretary Danny Alexander, Business Secretary Vince Cable, Justice Secretary Chris Grayling, Cabinet Office Minister Francis Maude, Dominic Grieve and the Bill Minister, Minister for Defence Equipment and Support, Philip Dunne.

Second reading
The second reading in the House of Commons took place on 16 July 2013.

Subsequent stages

Subsequent Parliamentary stages were as follows:

The Bill returned to the House of Commons on 29 April 2014, where a programme motion was passed, and Commons Consideration of Lords' Amendments took place.

Royal Assent

The Bill was given Royal Assent (and thus became an Act) on 14 May 2014.

Further reading

House of Commons Hansard, http://www.parliament.uk/business/publications/hansard/commons/
House of Lords Hansard, http://www.parliament.uk/business/publications/hansard/lords/

References

United Kingdom Acts of Parliament 2014
United Kingdom military law
British Armed Forces
Reform in the United Kingdom
Military reforms
2014 in military history
21st-century military history of the United Kingdom
Government procurement in the United Kingdom